A Girl Called Dusty is the debut studio album by English singer Dusty Springfield. It was released on 17 April 1964 in the United Kingdom by Philips Records. The album peaked at No. 6 on the UK Album Charts and No.5 on NME charts in May 1964.

Background

Dusty Springfield had been a member of the girl group The Lana Sisters from 1958 to 1960, and the folk-pop trio The Springfields from 1960–1963, in the latter case with her brother Tom Springfield. While on tour in the US in the early 1960s she was exposed to soul music, which was to have a profound impact on her subsequent life and career. Although The Springfields were moderately successful, with songs such as "Island of Dreams", "Bambino" and "Silver Threads And Golden Needles" (a No. 16 US country hit), their style of music limited the wide range of material that Dusty Springfield wanted to sing. Therefore, in 1963, Springfield decided to begin a career as a solo singer.

Her first single, "I Only Want to Be with You", was actually recorded while still a member of The Springfields, and was released one week after their final concert. The song was a success in both Britain and the US and led to the recording of A Girl Called Dusty which was released in 1964. The album contained a mix of mostly straightforward pop songs and a few Motown influenced numbers, such as "When The Lovelight Starts Shining Through His Eyes", "Will You Love Me Tomorrow" and "Mockingbird". It also marked Springfield's first collaboration with well-known songwriters Burt Bacharach and Hal David, as well as Gerry Goffin and Carole King, whose songs Springfield continued to record for the rest of her career.

At the time, A Girl Called Dusty was not released to the US market. Instead, Philips released a compilation of singles and tracks recorded for the album as Stay Awhile/I Only Want To Be With You. It was named after her first two singles, which had been Top 20 hits in the US. Later in 1964, Philips released Dusty, a second version of A Girl Called Dusty with a different track listing and different tracks.

Release history

A Girl Called Dusty was first released both in mono (BF 7594) and stereo (SBL 7594) on 17 April 1964 by Philips Records, in the LP album format. The album had its first CD release in June 1990 by Philips Records/PolyGram, then a direct transfer from vinyl. In 1997, two years before Springfield's death, a digitally remastered and expanded edition was issued by Mercury Records, then including eight bonus tracks as well as a few alternate mixes. Since most of the original multi-track master tapes are thought to be completely lost in the Philips Records archives, the vast majority of the tracks on the 1997 version are in mono, or in some cases, re-created stereo mixes using alternate vocal takes. The current CD version of A Girl Called Dusty, which still remains in print, is consequently radically different from the original album, as produced by Johnny Franz and Springfield herself.

Reception

The album was included in Robert Dimery's 1001 Albums You Must Hear Before You Die.

Track listing
Side A

Side B

Bonus tracks 1997 CD re-issue

Personnel and production
 Dusty Springfield – lead vocals
 The Breakaways – background vocals
 Johnny Franz – record producer
 Ivor Raymonde – orchestra director
 Keith Grant – engineer
 Roger Wake – digital remastering/remix (1997 re-issue)
 Mike Gill – digital remastering/remix (1997 re-issue)

Charts

References

Bibliography
 Howes, Paul (2007).

Dusty Springfield albums
1964 debut albums
Philips Records albums
Albums produced by Johnny Franz